Josh Walker may refer to:

 Josh Walker (footballer, born 1989), English footballer
 Josh Walker (footballer, born 1997), English footballer
 Josh Walker (American football) (born 1991), American football guard
 Josh Walker (Australian footballer) (born 1992),

See also  
 Joshua Walker (disambiguation)